Tang Yun (唐韵) is a violinist and a child actor from China. His most prominent performance was his role in the 2002 movie Together, directed by Chen Kaige.

External links 

Hong Kong Leisure and Culture Services Department

Chinese male child actors
Chinese classical violinists
Chinese violinists
Living people
People's Republic of China musicians
Chinese male film actors
Year of birth missing (living people)
21st-century classical violinists